Yes Action (stylized as yes Action and formerly called yes stars Action) is an Israeli television channel carried by the Israeli satellite television provider - yes, which broadcasts American, British and Israeli TV shows of the thrillers, Sci-Fi, action and competitive reality genres. The channel aired on December 14, 2008 on channel 13 - as part of the latest television shows' channels re-brand by yes. The channel replaced the former yes stars 2. The channel airs the shows' new episodes on weeknights (Sundays - Thursdays), and its re-runs on weekdays and weekends (Fridays - Saturdays).

yes Action schedule is being simulcasted in High Definition on yes Action HD on channel 17.

Picture Formats
yes Action airs shows in 4 formats:
 Normal (4:3)
 Letterboxed (4:3)
 Pan & Scan (4:3)
 Widescreen (16:9)

In order to watch widescreen (16:9) shows on a 4:3 TV, there are 3 options to see the picture: 
 4:3 Letterbox (Widescreen with black bars - Original Aspect Ratio)
 16:9 (Anamorphic Widescreen)
 4:3 (Pan & scan)

Choosing the format of the picture is in the digital set-top box setup. The setup does not affect shows which are not broadcast in Widescreen.

yes Action HD airs the shows in High Definition 1080i and in widescreen (16:9) at all times. Shows that are not shot in HD are upscaled to 1080i.

History of the channel

On March 4, 2007, yes replaced the channel yesSTARS - which has been cancelled on March 3, 2007 after exactly a year - with yes stars 2, as part of the re-brand of the foreign TV shows channels and expanding yesSTARS to 3 channels - yes stars 1, yes stars 2 and yes stars 3.

On March 14, 2008, as part of a new re-brand of the television shows channels on yes, yes Stars 2 obtained a new logo.

On December 14, 2008, as part of another re-brand of the channels, yes stars 2 was replaced with yes stars Action, and as of April 22, 2009 simulcasted its entire schedule in High Definition on yes stars Action HD, replacing yes stars HD, which aired most of the channel's shows in HD.

On August 20, 2010, the word stars was removed from the channel name.

Shows broadcast on yes Action

External links

Television channels in Israel
Yes (Israel)